Yao Xue (born 17 January 1991) is a Chinese badminton player.

Career 
Yao started playing badminton at the age of six. She trained in Shenzhen for two years. Yao with her excellent performance selected to Guangdong training team. A year later, she became a full member of the Guangdong team, also selected several national junior team. Her biggest achievement in the BWF Superseries event that is becoming the runner-up in the 2013 Malaysia Super Series in the women's singles event. In September 2013, she became the runner-up at the Indonesian Masters Grand Prix Gold tournament. In the final round, she defeated by her compatriot Suo Di with a tighter finish. Suo dominated the first game but she didn't give up so easily.  She tried to steal the second game but came up just short in the end and was unable to take her first international title. She won her first international title at the 2014 Malaysia Grand Prix Gold tournament.

Achievements

Summer Universiade 
Women's singles

BWF Superseries 
The BWF Superseries, which was launched on 14 December 2006 and implemented in 2007, is a series of elite badminton tournaments, sanctioned by the Badminton World Federation (BWF). BWF Superseries levels are Superseries and Superseries Premier. A season of Superseries consists of twelve tournaments around the world that have been introduced since 2011. Successful players are invited to the Superseries Finals, which are held at the end of each year.

Women's singles

  BWF Superseries Finals tournament
  BWF Superseries Premier tournament
  BWF Superseries tournament

BWF Grand Prix 
The BWF Grand Prix had two levels, the BWF Grand Prix and Grand Prix Gold. It was a series of badminton tournaments sanctioned by the Badminton World Federation (BWF) which was held from 2007 to 2017.

Women's singles

  BWF Grand Prix Gold tournament
  BWF Grand Prix tournament

References

External links 
 
 Kazan2013.com

1991 births
Living people
People from Jingzhou
Badminton players from Hubei
Chinese female badminton players
Universiade silver medalists for China
Universiade bronze medalists for China
Universiade medalists in badminton
Medalists at the 2013 Summer Universiade